Mexica is a board game designed by Wolfgang Kramer and Michael Kiesling and published in 2002 by Ravensburger in German and Rio Grande Games in English.  Mexica was awarded 5th prize in the 2002 Deutscher Spiele Preis.

Mexica is the third game in the Mask Trilogy, after Tikal and Java.  In the game, players attempt to partition the city of Tenochtitlan in Lake Texcoco into districts, and then gain influence over the most developed districts.

External links 
 
 

Board games introduced in 2002
Board games about history
Board games using action points
Wolfgang Kramer games
Michael Kiesling games
Ravensburger games
Rio Grande Games games